Nieuwebrug is a hamlet in the western Netherlands. It is located in the municipality of Haarlemmermeer, North Holland, about 11 km west of Amsterdam.

Nieuwebrug has a population of around 360.

References

Populated places in North Holland
Haarlemmermeer